Aerodrom (meaning Airport) was one of five city municipalities which constituted the City of Kragujevac. According to the 2002 census results, the municipality had a population of 36,217 inhabitants. The municipality was formed in May 2002, only to be dissolved in March 2008.

Municipality

The Municipality of Aerodrom covered the area of about 232 square kilometres, and comprised a part of urban Kragujevac and 17 villages:

 Aerodrom
 Uglješnica
 Vinogradi
 Šumarice
 Jovanovac
 Cvetojevac
 Resnik
 Novi Milanovac
 Petrovac
 Opornica
 Desimirovac
 Cerovac
 Lužnice
 Gornje Jarušice
 Čumić
 Mali Šenj
 Pajazitovo
 Mironić
 Gornje Grbice
 Šljivovac
 Poskurice

Gallery

References

External links

Šumadija
Defunct urban municipalities of Kragujevac
Šumadija District